Oliva bulbiformis, common name the black-tinted olive, is a species of sea snail, a marine gastropod mollusk in the family Olividae, the olives.

Description
The length of the shell varies between 21 mm and 45 mm.

Distribution
This marine species occurs in the Bay of Bengal, Sri Lanka the Philippines, Papua New Guinea and the Solomons.

References

 Liu, J.Y. [Ruiyu] (ed.). (2008). Checklist of marine biota of China seas. China Science Press. 1267 pp
 Raven J.G.M. (Han) & Recourt P. (2018). Notes on molluscs from NW Borneo. 4. Olivoidea (Gastropoda, Neogastropoda), with the description of eight new species. Vita Malacologica. 17: 113-155.
 Vervaet F.L.J. (2018). The living Olividae species as described by Pierre-Louis Duclos. Vita Malacologica. 17: 1-111

External links
 
 Ducros de Saint Germain A. M. P. (1857). Revue critique du genre Oliva de Bruguières. 120 pp

bulbiformis
Gastropods described in 1840